Kurt Jarasinski (6 November 1938 in Elpersbüttel – 27 October 2005 in Langerwehe) was a German equestrian and Olympic champion. He won a gold medal in show jumping with the German team at the 1964 Summer Olympics in Tokyo.

References

External links
 

1938 births
2005 deaths
German male equestrians
Olympic equestrians of the United Team of Germany
Olympic gold medalists for the United Team of Germany
Equestrians at the 1964 Summer Olympics
Olympic medalists in equestrian
Medalists at the 1964 Summer Olympics
20th-century German people